Trafficking protein particle complex subunit 2 is a protein that in humans is encoded by the TRAPPC2P1 gene.

This gene has been described as a transcribed retropseudogene (or retro-xaptonuon) based on its structure which lacks most of the introns of SEDL and the detection of transcripts from this locus. Most retropseudogenes are thought to not express protein products. A protein product could potentially be encoded by this retropseudogene that would be identical to the protein product of the SEDL gene. However, it remains unclear whether this gene encodes a protein product or is a transcribed retropseudogene.

References

Further reading

Proteins